Daniel Boaventura is a Brazilian actor and singer. 

Popular worldwide, Boaventura has held the lead roles in the musicals Peter Pan, My Fair Lady, Evita, and Chicago — as well as the role of patriarch, Gomez Addams, in the 2012 musical The Addams Family. Diane Warren wrote the song "Catch My Breath" for Boaventura; he had a recurring role on the Brazilian production of the television series, Family Ties.

Background

Born Daniel do Rêgo Boaventura on May 19, 1970 in Salvador, Brazil to two teachers, Boaventura grew up listening to Brazilian popular music (MPB) and classical music, and his early schooling included music training. When he was 15, he purchased a Dire Straits live album, which made a tremendous impact on his music sensibilities. With schoolmates, he formed two bands, Horas Vagas (Spare Time) and Os Tocáveis, while also completing courses in administration, public relations and advertising. The musical efforts remained informal until his band Horas Vagas was invited to participate in the musical Cinema Cantado.

In 1991, Fernando Guerreiro, creator of Cia. Baiana de Patifaria, noticed Boaventura on his stage debut, singing classic Broadway vocals. Guerreiro invited Boaventura to the musical Zás Trás. He subsequently performed a solo show called "Pop n' Jazz," for which he won the Caymmi Trophy in the covers category — and soon after took part in a production of Bertold Brecht's O Casamento do Pequeno Bourgeois (A Respectable Wedding) where he sang, acted and played saxophone.

Boaventura was married to Juliana Serbeto from 1998 to 2011; they have two daughters Joana (2003) and Isabela (2009).

Career

Filmography

References

External links
Daniel Boaventura Website

1970 births
Living people
English-language singers from Brazil
People from Salvador, Bahia
Brazilian male film actors
Brazilian male stage actors
Brazilian male television actors